Return of the Gunfighter is a studio album by country music singer Marty Robbins. It was released in 1963 by Columbia Records.

The album was released before Billboard magazine established its country album chart. When the chart was created at the beginning of 1964, the album was still on the chart, registered at No. 8, and remained on the chart for 12 weeks.

Two of the album's tracks, "San Angelo" and "The Master's Call", were re-recordings of songs originally appearing on Robbins' earlier Gunfighter Ballads albums. AllMusic gave the album a rating of four-and-a-half stars.

Track listing
Side A
 "San Angelo" – 5:32
 "Man Walks Among Us" – 3:03
 "Tall Handsome Stranger" – 2:05
 "Dusty Winds" – 1:51
 "The Master's Call" – 2:53
 "The Fastest Gun Around" – 1:45

Side B
 "Old Red" – 3:09
 "The Bend in the River" – 2:32
 "Johnny Fedavo" – 3:01
 "Abilene Rose" – 2:59
 "Doggone Cowboy" – 2:08
 "The Red Hills of Utah" – 2:05

References

1963 albums
Marty Robbins albums
Columbia Records albums